House at 46 South Main Street is a historic home located actually at 63 South Main St. in the village Moravia in Cayuga County, New York.  It is listed on the National Register of Historic Places, however, as "House at 46 South Main Street"; the street numbering was changed since). 

It is a two-story, frame, Italianate style residence. The house appears to have been built between 1884 and 1887.

It was listed on the National Register in 1995.

References

External links

Houses on the National Register of Historic Places in New York (state)
Italianate architecture in New York (state)
Houses in Cayuga County, New York
National Register of Historic Places in Cayuga County, New York
Moravia (village), New York